The New Zealand national cricket team toured South Africa from October 1953 to February 1954 and played a five match Test series against the South Africa national cricket team. South Africa won the Test series 4–0. The tour was the first by a representative New Zealand side to South Africa and the tourists embarked on their visit without having won a Test match since they had been granted full member status of the Imperial Cricket Conference in 1930.

South Africa were captained by Jack Cheetham and New Zealand by Geoff Rabone.

Tour party
The New Zealand team was captained by Geoff Rabone with Bert Sutcliffe as vice-captain. Rabone had been reluctant to tour but was chosen as captan ahead of Merv Wallace, who had captained New Zealand when South Africa had toured in 1952–53. Despite having retired from Test cricket in 1951, the experienced Walter Hadlee was asked to captain the side but declined and Rabone agreed to lead the tour. Wallace chose not to join the tour after Rabone was appointed. Sutcliffe, who was New Zealand's outstanding post-war batsman, captained the New Zealanders during the fourth and fifth Test matches after Rabone broke a bone in his foot.

The average age of the team was 25. With the aim of establishing a high standard of fielding, some older or slower players were overlooked, including the spinners Tom Burtt and Alex Moir, and the opening batsman Gordon Leggat. Leggat later joined the team for the Australian leg of the tour, replacing the injured Rabone.

Geoff Rabone (captain)
Bert Sutcliffe (vice-captain)
John Beck
Bill Bell
Bob Blair
Murray Chapple
Eric Dempster
Ian Leggat
Tony MacGibbon
Lawrie Miller
Frank Mooney
Guy Overton
Matt Poore
John Reid

The manager was the former Test batsman Jack Kerr. The four players who had not yet played Test cricket – Beck, Bell, Ian Leggat and Overton – all played their first Tests on the tour.

Tour itinerary
The tour took place between October 1953 and March 1954, with the New Zealanders in South Africa until mid-February. Three first-class matches were played in Australia during March on the return leg of the tour, and the touring team played a match against a New Zealand XI on their return to their home country. The team left New Zealand on the Arawa on 1 October, arriving in Cape Town on 28 October after visiting Port Melbourne and Fremantle in Australia.

A total of 17 matches were played in South Africa during the tour, 16 of which were first-class. Seven matches were played before the first Test match, including one in Rhodesia. A single match took place between the first and second Tests and three further first-class matches were played between the third and fourth Tests; Rabone was injured during the final first-class match against Border, immediately before the fourth Test was played.

Test series
All of the Test matches during the tour were four-day matches and used 8-ball overs. South Africa won four of the matches, although the New Zealanders were in strong positions in two of these matches. The third Test was a draw.

First Test
The first Test match of the series was played at Kingsmead Cricket Ground in Durban, beginning on 11 December 1953. South Africa's Neil Adcock and New Zealand's Guy Overton made their Test match debuts during the match.

South Africa gained a "great advantage" by winning the toss and chose to bat on a wicket which Wisden said "became more difficult as the match progressed". They scored 437 runs before declaring their innings complete after 115 overs. An opening century-partnership between Jackie McGlew and John Waite provided a foundation for the innings, with Roy McLean and Ken Funston also adding 135 for the fourth wicket, McLean top-scoring with an innings of 101. In reply, New Zealand finished the second day's play on 70 for the loss of 2 wickets (70/2) with captain Geoff Rabone unbeaten on 40 runs.

After a rest day on 13 December, Rabone completed his first century in Test cricket, scoring 107 in an innings which lasted over six hours, but New Zealand were all out for 230, and were asked to follow on. Off spin bowler Hugh Tayfield took six wickets for the cost of 62 runs (6/62) from his 36 overs, and Wisden reported that both he and leg spinner Clive van Ryneveld, who took three wickets, turned the ball "sharply" and "bowled with sustained accurately". After losing two quick wickets at the end of the third day's play, they were all out for 149, losing the match by an innings and 58 runs. Rabone, who "again resisted strongly", top-scored with 60 in New Zealand's second innings and batted for 9¾ hours of the 11¼ that New Zealand batted for.

Second Test
The second test was famous for New Zealand player Bob Blair receiving news that his fiancée, Nerissa Love, had been killed in the Tangiwai railway disaster on Christmas Eve. Blair was not expected to bat when his turn came on Boxing Day, as an announcement had been made that he would take no further part in the game. In the event, however, he appeared at the crease at the fall of the ninth wicket to join Bert Sutcliffe, who had already started to walk off the field. The packed crowd stood in silence. The two men added 33 for the last wicket and avoided a follow on, with Sutcliffe striking three sixes and Blair one from a single eight-ball over, but in the next over Blair was stumped off Hugh Tayfield. South Africa won the match by 132 runs.

Third Test

Fourth Test

Fifth Test

Notes

References

Further reading
 Dick Brittenden, Silver Fern on the Veld, A.H. & A.W. Reed, Wellington, 1954
 Richard Boock, The Last Everyday Hero: The Bert Sutcliffe Story, Longacre, Auckland, 2010, pp. 18–26, 101–108
 John Reid, Sword of Willow, A.H. & A.W. Reed, Wellington, 1962, pp. 69–89
 Don Neely, Richard Payne, Men in White: The History of New Zealand International Cricket, 1894–1985, Moa, Auckland, 1986, pp. 216–234

1953 in New Zealand cricket
1953 in South African cricket
1954 in New Zealand cricket
1954 in South African cricket
International cricket competitions from 1945–46 to 1960
1953-54
South African cricket seasons from 1970–71 to 1999–2000